Ciudad Real International Airport or CRIA , previously known as Central Airport CR, Don Quijote Airport and South Madrid Airport, is an international airport and long-storage facility, situated south of Ciudad Real in Spain. Constructed at a cost of €1.1 billion, it was opened in 2009, and became the first private international airport in Spain.

Operations at the site ran for three years until April 2012, when its previous management company filed for bankruptcy and went into receivership, after the last flight operator, low-cost airline Vueling, withdrew its last route from the airport. It remained closed for seven years until finally reopening in September 2019, however without any scheduled passenger traffic.

Facilities
Its design was to enable the airport to accept all forms of commercial airliners, including the Airbus A380. The passenger terminal was designed so that it could process two million passengers a year, and a maximum of ten million passengers a year if additional modules were added, while its cargo facilities were designed to handle a maximum of 47,000 tonnes a year. One part of the airport was designed with facilities to cater for private flights and sport flights. The airport is linked by road to the A-41 motorway.

As part of its planned expansion, the airport was to feature a maintenance area, a heliport and an industrial zone of over 8 km2.

History

Operations (2008–2012) 
Following its opening in 2009, the airport's first flights were to Palma de Mallorca, run by Air Berlin until it discontinued this service on 30 May 2010. Air Nostrum also operated flights to Barcelona, Gran Canaria, and briefly to Lanzarote.

Ciudad Real Airport began handling international flights in June 2010, with its first international service launched by Ryanair. The airline service ran three flights per week from London Stansted, until its discontinuation on 11 November that year, having flown approximately 22,000 passengers into or from the airport. The cancellation of the route, which resulted in the loss of 22 jobs, was the result of a breakdown in trade agreements with Ryanair, and financial difficulties being faced by the airport. Spanish low-cost carrier Vueling became the only airline serving the airport at this point, running flights to Barcelona, Paris and Palma de Mallorca, until it eventually ended services on 29 October 2011.

By 2012, the airport's financial difficulties forced the management company to file for bankruptcy, after accumulating more than €300 million of debt, eventually going into receivership. By 13 April 2012, all airport operations were shut down, and would remain so for more than 7 years.

Reasons for bankruptcy
Much of the fault behind the closure of Ciudad Real Airport lay within the following factors. The first factor was centered around the poor planning of its construction. During the early planning stages, some deficiencies were overlooked. The main one was its location in a Bird Special Protection Area (SPA)  and in the middle of the inactive Campo de Calatrava Volcanic Field, with the European Union blocking its construction until environmental protection measures had been taken (moving a portion of the protected area  and downsizing the airport facilities). This delayed the initial opening for four years (2008 instead of 2004).

Meanwhile, in 2006 the main airport of Madrid (Barajas) finished work on an expansion that allowed it to handle 70 million passengers a year, relieving the previously over-saturated facilities.

Had construction of a station on the Madrid–Seville high-speed rail line been made, as had been originally planned, journey times to the airport would have been more reasonable – at present, travel times from Madrid to Ciudad Real by train stand at around fifty minutes. But before bankruptcy, only the bridge that would connect the station to the terminal was built. There is also a disused railway station in the vicinity of the airport (Cañada de Calatrava station), but it only provides access to the conventional railway, not to the high-speed one.

Finally, the period when the airport first operated coincided with the worst years of the financial crisis in Spain, that resulted in a decrease of traffic in all Spanish airports, with passenger traffic at Ciudad Real airport measured within the low thousands. In addition, its main shareholder Caja Castilla-La Mancha (a regional savings bank)  was the first Spanish bank to be bailed-out during the crisis, due to their investments in the Airport, and in several building companies, both small local ones and some big ones such as Colonial, which failed due to the housing bubble burst.

Other sources point to overoptimism in passenger numbers, while a BBC News magazine report published suggestions that the airport's investors had intended for the airport to fail; all had benefited from construction contracts awarded to their own companies.

On receivership
On 9 December 2013, having been considered to be a significant contributor towards the financial trouble of the creditor institutions and the Castilla-La Mancha Regional Government, Ciudad Real Airport was put up for auction with a minimum asking price of €100 million. No offers were made, and so extensions were made to the sale period over time, with the Commercial Court of Ciudad Real agreeing a 7th extension to the sale deadline on 27 July 2014, but with the asking price reduced to €80 million by this time.

On 17 July 2015, Chinese investment company Tzaneen International put forward a bid of €10,000 to buy the airport, stating that their intention was to invest an additional €100 million towards redeveloping the airport towards becoming a European hub for Chinese cargo shipments. However, the Commercial Court rejected the bid on the grounds that the offer was too low, and that the terminal building and the car parks would not have been included in the deal. In September 2015, an unidentified UK group made an offer to the court of €28 million for the airport, though complications led the sale to fall through.

Sale and operations (2019–2021)

The airport was sold in April 2016  to the new company CRIA (CR International Airport SL). Due to financial  and bureaucratic  difficulties, the sale was not finalized until 2018.
The airport was finally reopened in 12 September 2019, and in October 2019 the Irish company Direct Aero Services opened a maintenance base. Spanish firm Jet Aircraft Services (JAS) also opened an aircraft dismantling base in December 2019.

The airport has also had some general aviation movements since the reopening, while commercial passenger flights are not expected in the near future.

In May 2020, cargo flights returned to the airport, as part of a Guangzhou–Ciudad Real cargo corridor to bring medical equipment during the COVID-19 pandemic and the passenger airline based at the airport, Galistair, arrived, but left later that year to Granada.

That same month, the first airplanes parking at the facilities due to that pandemic arrived for storage. By August 2020 it was already hosting around 60 airplanes, from Vueling, Iberia, South African, Aer Lingus or Virgin Atlantic, and was planning to expand to host around 200 by the end of the year. Even if the expansion did not take place, the airport hosted around 80 airplanes at the peak of the pandemic, becoming one of the preferred locations in Europe for temporary storage. However, by July 2021 half of the aircraft were put back into operation by their respective airlines, and the airport closed its doors temporarily as it had defaulted on its payments to several suppliers.

Media
Before opening and after closure, the airport has been used in a number media ventures:
 In 2012, Spanish film director Pedro Almodóvar used the airport to film a number of portions for his film I'm So Excited!.
 In 2013, Volvo Trucks used the disused runway to film the "Epic Split" commercial. The scene features actor Jean-Claude Van Damme narrating and performing the splits between two moving trucks driving in reverse. Planning for the stunt involved the use of professionals to drive the trucks, with filming done within one take and directed by Andreas Nilsson.
 On 14 July 2013, Top Gear aired a special feature film for the third episode of its 20th series, filmed earlier that year, in which presenters Jeremy Clarkson, James May and Richard Hammond visited the disused airport during a "budget" supercar challenge in Spain. The presenters took time to explore the empty terminal building, before racing their cars – a McLaren 12C, Audi R8 and Ferrari 458 – on the closed runway.
 In 2019, Canadian airline WestJet aired a commercial that was filmed in the airport.

References

External links
 
 Official website
 Official website under previous management

Airports in Castilla–La Mancha
Buildings and structures in the Province of Ciudad Real
Transport companies of Spain
Airports established in 2008
Airports disestablished in 2012
Airports established in 2019